Lee Fairfax Cissel (May 27, 1932 – October 28, 1977) was an American football coach.  He was the head football coach for the Bethel College in North Newton, Kansas, serving for two seasons, from  1970 to 1971, and compiling a record of 4–14.

Cissel had previously coached for the United States Navy and Vanderbilt University. He resided in Fort Lauderdale, Florida.

Head coaching record

References

External links
 

1932 births
1977 deaths
Bethel Threshers football coaches
Vanderbilt Commodores football coaches